Lypotigris fusalis is a moth in the family Crambidae. It was described by George Hampson in 1904. It is found on the Bahamas, in Costa Rica, Cuba and Florida.

The wingspan is about 17 mm. Adults have been recorded nearly year round in Florida.

References

Moths described in 1904
Lygropia